David Guy Bedingham (born 22 April 1994) is an English-South African cricketer. He holds United Kingdom ancestry visa and qualified as a local player.

Career
Bedingham made his first-class debut for Northerns in the 2012–13 CSA Provincial Three-Day Competition on 14 March 2013.

He was the leading run-scorer in the 2017–18 CSA Provincial One-Day Challenge tournament for Boland, with 283 runs in seven matches. He was also the leading run-scorer in the 2017–18 Sunfoil 3-Day Cup for Boland, with 790 runs in eight matches.

In June 2018, he was named in the squad for the Cape Cobras team for the 2018–19 season. In September 2018, he was named in Boland's squad for the 2018 Africa T20 Cup. In September 2019, he was named in the squad for the Cape Town Blitz team for the 2019 Mzansi Super League tournament.

In September 2019, he was named in Western Province's squad for the 2019–20 CSA Provincial T20 Cup. In April 2021, he was named in Western Province's squad, ahead of the 2021–22 cricket season in South Africa. Later the same month, Bedingham scored his maiden double century in first-class cricket, with 257 runs for Durham in the 2021 County Championship in England. In the inaugural season of The Hundred, he was signed by the Birmingham Phoenix to replace Finn Allen for the remainder of the tournament.

References

External links
 

1994 births
Living people
People from George, South Africa
Cricketers from the Western Cape
South African people of English descent
South African emigrants to the United Kingdom
South African cricketers
Birmingham Phoenix cricketers
Boland cricketers
Cape Cobras cricketers
Cape Town Blitz cricketers
Durham cricketers
Western Province cricketers